William Henry Cooke (7 March 1919 – 1992) was an English professional footballer, best known as a player for Luton Town.

Career

Cooke began his career with Bournemouth & Boscombe Athletic, but failed to play a league game for the south coast club before moving to Luton Town in 1946. Cooke was more of a success at Luton, making 228 appearances in all competitions before signing for Shrewsbury Town for the 1953–54 season. Joining Watford in 1954, Cooke played 10 games for the club during the 1954–55 season before transferring to Bedford Town.

References

1919 births
English footballers
English Football League players
AFC Bournemouth players
Luton Town F.C. players
Shrewsbury Town F.C. players
Watford F.C. players
Bedford Town F.C. players
1992 deaths
Sportspeople from Oswestry
Association football defenders